Sulgan (also Romanized as Sūlgān; also known as Selagūn and Sūlījān) is a village in Dowrahan Rural District, Gandoman District, Borujen County, Chaharmahal and Bakhtiari Province, Iran. At the 2006 census, its population was 306, in 87 families.

References 

Populated places in Borujen County